Taiwan Institute of Economic Research (TIER) is an incorporated non-profit research institute in Zhongshan District, Taipei, Taiwan.

History
Established on 1 September 1976, it was the first independent academic research institute in Taiwan. Similar to the Chung-Hua Institution for Economic Research, its mission is to provide research into the domestic and foreign economies and industries and to provide the results to the government and industry for consideration, encouraging the development of Taiwan's economy. It is a major provider of economic information about Taiwan, greater China, and Asia, and also acts as one of two major economic policy think tanks in Taiwan. Funding is provided through an endowment, donations, as well as income generated from research publications.

TIER is a major participant in the Pacific Basin Economic Council (PBEC), Pacific Economic Cooperation Council (PECC), Asia-Pacific Economic Cooperation (APEC), and the Pacific Trade and Development Conference (PAFTAD)

Organizational structure
 Board of Directors
 President, Vice President, Chief Operating Officer
 Office of the President
 Secretariat of Industrial Development Advisory Council
 Macroeconomic Forecasting Center
 Chinese Industrial and Economic Research Center
 Climate Change and Policy Response Research Center
 Intellectual Property Valuation Service Center
 Economic Development Strategic Planning Center
 Research Division I
 Research Division II
 Research Division III
 Research Division IV
 Research Division V
 Research Division VI
 Research Division VII
 Tokyo Office
 Department of International Affairs
 Department of Industrial Development
 Taiwan Industry Economics Services
 Survey and Statistics Center
 Biotechnology Industry Study Center
 Regional Development Research Center
 Department of Administration
 Department of Information Technology
 Information Service Center
 Auditing Committee
 Advisory Committee

Transportation
The institute is accessible within walking distance North from Zhongshan Elementary School Station of the Taipei Metro.

See also
Economy of Taiwan
Chung-Hua Institution for Economic Research
Institute of Economics, Academia Sinica

References

External links
Taiwan Institute of Economic Research - Official Website 

1976 establishments in Taiwan
Economic research institutes in Taiwan
Think tanks based in Taiwan